Gersloot is a village in Heerenveen in the province of Friesland, the Netherlands.

The village was first mentioned in 1281 as Gerslach and means tapered ditch. It used to have a church, but it was demolished in 1735, and only the bell tower remains. In 1840, it was home to 146 people.
Before 1934, Gersloot was part of the Aengwirden municipality.

Gallery

References

External links

Populated places in Friesland
Heerenveen